Deshaun or DeShaun is a masculine given name which may refer to:

 Deshaun Davis (born 1996), American football player
 DeShaun Foster (born 1980), American former National Football League player and college football coach
 Deshaun Thomas (born 1991), American basketball player
 Deshaun Watson (born 1995), American National Football League quarterback

See also
 DeShawn, another given name

English-language masculine given names